Judson is an unincorporated community in Sullivan County, in the U.S. state of Missouri.

History
A post office called Judson was established in 1861, and remained in operation until 1905. Besides the post office, Judson had a country store.

References

Unincorporated communities in Sullivan County, Missouri
Unincorporated communities in Missouri